Kuzmin (masculine) or Kuzmina (feminine) is a Russian surname that is derived from the male given name Kuzma and literally means Kuzma's. It may refer to:

Afanasijs Kuzmins (born 1947), Latvian shooter
Anastasiya Vladimirovna Kuzmina (born 1984), Russian-born Slovak biathlete
Andrei Kuzmin (born 1981), Russian ice hockey player
Dmitry Kuzmin
Dmitri Kuzmin (born 1977), Russian-born Kyrgyzstani swimmer
Dmitry Sergeyevich Kuzmin (born 1966), Russian politician
Dmitry Vladimirovich Kuzmin (born 1968), Russian poet
Dmitry Vladimirovich Kuzmin-Karavayev (1886–1959), Russian communist and Catholic priest
Dmytro Kuzmin, Ukrainian paralympic swimmer
Ekaterina Anatolievna Kuzmina (born 1996), Russian curler
Fyodor Sergeyevich Kuzmin (born 1983), Russian table tennis player
Gennady Pavlovich Kuzmin (1946–2020), Ukrainian chess player and coach
Grigori Kuzmin (1917–1988), Estonian astronomer
Igor Kuzmin (born 1982), Estonian rower
Iosif Iosifovich Kuzmin (1910–1996), Soviet politician
Irina Kuzmina (born 1986), Latvian tennis player
Ivan Nikolayevich Kuzmin (born 1962), Russian ski-orienteer
Leonid Kuzmin, Belarusian pianist
Matvey Kuzmich Kuzmin (1858–1942), Russian peasant and Soviet hero
Mikhail Kuzmin (1872–1936), Russian poet, musician and novelist
Nikolai Nikolayevich Kuzmin (1883–1938), Soviet politician and military commander
Oleg Aleksandrovich Kuzmin (born 1981), Russian football player
Renat Ravelievich Kuzmin (born 1967), Ukrainian public prosecutor
Rodion Osievich Kuzmin (born 1891), Russian mathematician
Roman Ivanovich Kuzmin (1811–1867), Russian architect
Sergei Kuzmin (disambiguation)
Sergei Anatolyevich Kuzmin (born 1967), Russian football player
Sergei Vasilyevich Kuzmin (born 1987), Russian boxer
Stanislav Kuzmin (born 1986), Kazakhstani swimmer
Svetlana Kuzmina (born 1969), Russian swimmer
Vadim Alexeevich Kuzmin (1937–2015), Russian physicist
Vadim Petrovich Kuzmin (1964–2012), Russian musician
Valentin Kuzmin (1941–2008), Russian swimmer
Viktoria Kuzmina (born 1998), Russian artistic gymnast
Vladimir Kuzmin
Vladimir Borisovitsch Kuzmin (born 1955), Russian musician
Vladimir Dmitrievich Kuzmin-Karavaev (1859–1928), Russian lawyer and politician
Yelena Kuzmina (disambiguation)
Yelena Alexandrovna Kuzmina (1909–1979), Soviet actress
Yelena Yefimovna Kuzmina, Russian archaeologist
Yevgeniya Kuzmina
Yevgeniya (Eugenia Kuzmina; born 1987), Russian-born American actress and model
Yevgeniya Kuzmina, Kazakhstani ski-orienteer
Vitaliy Kuzmin (Kuz Kuz), AP Euro Teacher  

Russian-language surnames